

Results

Men's cross-country eliminator